Orroral River, a perennial stream of the Murrumbidgee catchment within the Murray–Darling basin, is located in the Australian Capital Territory, Australia.

Course
The river rises in the southern ranges of Namadgi National Park, south of Canberra, with flow generated by runoff and melting snow during spring from the Snowy Mountains. The river flows generally south-east, joined by one minor tributaries, before reaching its confluence with the Gudgenby River, south of Tharwa; descending  over its  course.

See also

References

 

Rivers of the Australian Capital Territory
Murray-Darling basin